P.A.O.K. Water Polo Club is the men's water polo team of the major Greek multi-sport club P.A.O.K., based in Thessaloniki. It was founded in 1931.

Current roster 
2016–2017

External links
Official website
PAOK AC

Water polo clubs in Greece
PAOK